This is a list of Bien de Interés Cultural landmarks in the Province of Zamora, Spain.

 Gate of Doña Urraca
 Church of Santa María Magdalena (Zamora)
 San Pedro de la Nave

References 

 
Zamora